Mohammed Masud Raza Khan (21 July 1924 - 7 June 1989) was a Pakistani-British psychoanalyst. His training analyst was Donald Winnicott. Masud Raza Khan was a protege of Sigmund Freud's daughter Anna Freud, and a long-time collaborator with Donald Winnicott.

Early life

Named Ibrahim at birth, Khan was born in Jhelum in the Punjab, then part of British India, now in Pakistan. His father, Fazaldad (c. 1846-1943), was a Shiite Muslim of peasant birth who had ben richly rewarded by the British for the family's support and military service during the conquest of the region, and became a wealthy landowning zamindar, adopting the name "Khan Bahadur Fazaldad Khan". He farmed, specialized in the breeding and sale of horses to the British in the army and for polo. He married four times (his first wife was a cousin, from whom he divorced due to infertility; the third wife died at a fairly young age), and had nine sons and several daughters. His fourth wife, whom he married when he was 76 and she claiming to be seventeen, was Khursheed Begum (1905-1971); Masud Khan was ashamed of the marriage because she was an opium-addicted courtesan and "former dancing girl" with an illegitimate son. Khan referred to his father as "normally a cruel and authoritative feudal lord", observing him to be "a gaunt, bleak, monumental presence, either utterly still or raging in wild temper" for whose affection his sons competed and by whom they were disciplined with beatings, Masud, the youngest, was the only one to escape this form of punishment but nevertheless subjected to his father's high expectations and verbal chastisement. Khan, however, never criticized his harsh parenting, observing himself to have been "brought up an indulged child under an iron discipline". The marriage of Fazaldad Khan and Khursheed Begum- considered inappropriate due to his old age- caused friction with Fazaldad's second wife and their eldest son and heir, Akbar, who took her to live with him at Lahore. 

Masud Khan was raised with his older brother Tahir and his younger sister Mahmooda on his father's estate in the Montgomery District. They moved to Lyallpur when Khan was 13. He was not allowed to see much of his mother during his early years, but after his father died in 1943, when Khan was 19, he went to live with her. An estrangement between them had arisen in Khan's youth, when she struck him for criticizing her late return from her ancestral home; Khan had reassured his father, who doubted her, that she would return within thirty days as she had stated, but she remained for fifteen days beyond that date, incurring her husband's fury and anxiety. On her return, Khan refused to greet her; when challenged, he replied to his mother that she had dishonoured her husband and let her son down, and was slapped in the face in response. Although Khan records that "I quietly said, 'I will never speak to you again, unless you ask for me and order me.' I never did, to her dying day", this does not appear to have been entirely true; nevertheless, he considered her a simple woman with a tendency to "anxious chatter" and became distant from her as he grew up. 

Khan stated that he was groomed as his father's heir from the age of four, accompanying Fazaldad in conducting estate business and watching him preside over the local court. Before this, he commented his father "hardly knew" him. When asked by his mother and governess what he would ask from his father as a birthday gift, Khan replied "four million rupees"; on being persuaded by them to ask for less, when his father asked him he requested "a penny", which amused Fazaldad. Khan claimed that at the age of thirteen, his father handed over his estate, saying ""All this goes to you because you were content with a penny." This developing relationship between father and son was marked by the change of Khan's name from Ibrahim to Mohammed; several older brothers had the latter as a first name, in particular his father's deceased favourite child, Mohammed Baqar, different from his brothers, military men, in being an intellectual; he was killed in a motorcycle accident aged 19 when a student at Oxford, the year before Khan's birth; Fazaldad encouraged Khan to "take Baqar's place as the family intellectual".

In his later life Masud Khan's share of his father's vast estate was managed by his mother's illegitimate son Salahuddin ("Salah"; 1914-1979). In 1956 Masud Khan, his brother Tahir and their stepbrother Salah built a cinema, the Rex, in Lyallpur. After the collapse of the Pakistani cinema industry in the 1980s it became the Masud Super Market and Rex Hotel.

Khan once wrote of himself: "I am tall, handsome, a good polo and squash player. Fit. Only forty one. Very rich. Noble born. Delightfully married to a famous artist. Live in the style of my own making. I am a Muslim and Pakistani. My roots are sunk deep and widespread across three cultures."

Khan wrote in his Work Books that he inherited his shyness, sensitivity, and warmth from his mother, and from his father, an "imperious capacity for work and a terrible temper." He had a slight deformity, a "deformed and oversized" right ear that stuck out, of which he was very conscious, later taking to wearing a beret to hide it, until Winnicott persuaded him to have it fixed in 1951.

Education
Khan attended the University of Punjab at Faisalabad and Lahore from 1942–5. He obtained his BA in English literature, and his MA for a thesis on James Joyce's Ulysses.

Masud Raza Khan acquired his double Masters in English Literature and Psychology from University of Punjab and later applied to the British Psychoanalytic Association to be accepted as an analyst.

Contributions to psychoanalysis
Khan was a protege of Sigmund Freud's daughter Anna and a long-time collaborator with D. W. Winnicott. Anna Freud insisted that Khan understood her father's work better than anyone else and spoke in defence of her star pupil whenever he aroused the British Psycho-Analytical Society's ire.

His contributions include the concept of cumulative trauma as creating psychopathology introducing the concept of lack of fit between child and parent creating an ongoing trauma affecting development. Most of his work built on Winnicottian metapsychology and is an extension of Winnicott's thinking. Examples of this include the concept of "secret as potential space" or further developments of the dream text and the dream space. Another concept of Khan's is that of "lying fallow", a state of mind entered by the patient after prolonged clinical work in which a metabolization of psychic transformation occurs.

He produced a number of papers highlighting perversions as stemming from a split within the personality and the acting out of disturbed object relations collected in his book Alienation in Perversions.

Controversy
Khan's position in the British Psychoanalytical Society as training analyst gave him legitimacy, while at the same time he became less and less adherent to psychoanalytic guidelines with  boundary violations including socialising with his students and analysands.

He lost his status as training analyst and later resigned from the British Psychoanalytical Society after the publication of his last book When Spring Comes in which he included a blatantly anti-semitic tirade against a Jewish patient. Masud Khan however insisted that his remarks were therapeutic in nature.

Research by Linda Hopkins has also brought to light numerous sexual abuses by Masud Khan, where he would force onto his female patients sexual acts that he pretended had therapeutic effect.

In his later years he insisted on being called Prince Raja Khan and signed letters in this way, claiming to have inherited the title from his Pakistani ancestors .

Personal life
Khan was married initially to the dancer Jane Shore; he later divorced her and in 1959 married ballerina Svetlana Beriosova; they divorced in 1974. Together with Beriosova he led a prominent social life in a London scene which included well-known figures such as actress Julie Andrews, photographer Zoë Dominic, actor Peter O'Toole and members of the Redgrave family. Khan was described as tall, handsome with oriental charm and sex appeal, he was known as charming, charismatic and infamous for impromptu flashes of psychoanalytic insights given randomly to people met at social occasions. His paradoxical and highly unpredictable nature was summarised by his close friend and colleague, the French psychoanalyst, Victor Smirnoff, who wrote at his death:

He died at his home in London in 1989.

Bibliography
"The Privacy of the Self" (1974)
"Alienation in Perversions" (1979), Publisher: Karnac Books (October 1979), 
"Hidden Selves: Between Theory and Practice" (1983)
"When Spring Comes: Awakenings in Clinical Psychoanalysis" (1988), published as "The Long Wait" in the US

Literature

Notes

References
Linda Hopkins: False Self. The Life of Masud Khan., New York: Other Press, 2006
Roger Willoughby (Author), Pearl King (Foreword): Masud Khan: The Myth And The Reality [ILLUSTRATED], Publisher: Free Association Books; 1 edition (January 2005), 
Judy Cooper: Speak of Me As I Am: The Life and Work of Masud Khan, Publisher: Karnac Books; 1 edition (1 February 1994),

External links
Saving Masud Khan, by Wynne Godley A first-hand account of analysis under Khan
Psycho Analyst, By AMY BLOOM New York Times, Published: 21 January 2007
The Review – BOOKS Published: 20 November 2008
 The Institute of Psychoanalysis & British Psychoanalytical Society

British psychoanalysts
Analysands of D. W. Winnicott
Analysands of Ella Freeman Sharpe
1924 births
1989 deaths
Pakistani emigrants to the United Kingdom